Indal Persaud (10 January 1940 – 1 December 1994) was a Guyanese cricketer. He played in four first-class matches for British Guiana from 1960 to 1965.

See also
 List of Guyanese representative cricketers

References

External links
 

1940 births
1994 deaths
Guyanese cricketers
Guyana cricketers